Henrietta Godolphin, 2nd Duchess of Marlborough (19 July 1681 – 24 October 1733) was the daughter of John Churchill, 1st Duke of Marlborough, general of the army, and Sarah Jennings, Duchess of Marlborough, close friend and business manager of Queen Anne.

She was born Henrietta Churchill and became The Hon. Henrietta Churchill when her father was made a Scottish Lord of Parliament in 1682. She became Lady Henrietta Churchill in 1689, when her father was created Earl of Marlborough. Upon her marriage to The Hon. Francis Godolphin in March 1698, she became Lady Henrietta Godolphin, then Viscountess Rialton in 1706, when her father-in-law was created Earl of Godolphin. When her husband succeeded as 2nd Earl of Godolphin in 1712, she became Countess of Godolphin.

An act of the English parliament in 1706 allowed the 1st Duke's daughters to inherit his English titles. Following his death in 1722, Lady Godolphin became suo jure Duchess of Marlborough.

She bore five children during her marriage to Lord Godolphin:

William Godolphin, Marquess of Blandford (c. 1700–1731), married Maria Catherina de Jong, no issue
Lord Henry Godolphin (b. c. 1700)
Lady Henrietta Godolphin (1701–1776), married the 1st Duke of Newcastle, no issue
Lady Margaret Godolphin (b. c. 1703)
Lady Mary Godolphin (1723–1764), married the 4th Duke of Leeds and had issue. It was rumoured that Lady Mary Godolphin was not, in fact, the daughter of the 2nd Earl of Godolphin, but rather daughter of the playwright William Congreve and Henrietta Godolphin.

The Duchess died in 1733, aged 52, in Harrow, Middlesex, and was buried on 9 November 1733 in Westminster Abbey. Her titles passed to her nephew, the 5th Earl of Sunderland.

Footnotes

References
  

Henrietta Godolphin, 2nd Duchess of Marlborough
102
Daughters of British dukes
Hereditary women peers
1681 births
1733 deaths
Henrietta
English duchesses
Godolphin
Burials at Westminster Abbey